Karl Marx (5 May 1818 – 14 March 1883) was a German philosopher, economist, sociologist, journalist, and revolutionary socialist. Born in Trier to a middle-class family, he later studied political economy and Hegelian philosophy. For a general review of Karl Marx biographies, see the article "Two Centuries of Karl Marx Biographies: An Overview" by Angelo Segrillo.

Major works

20th century

Karl Marx: The Story of His Life (1918)

Karl Marx: The Story of His Life is a 1918 book about Karl Marx by Franz Mehring, a German historian. Considered the classical biography of Marx, the work has been translated into many languages, including Russian (1920), Danish (1922), Hungarian (1925), Japanese (1930), Spanish (1932), and English (1935).

Marx: Man and Fighter (1933)
Marx: Man and Fighter is a biography by Boris Nicolaievsky, first published in German in 1933. It was translated into English by Otto Mänchen-Helfen and published in 1936. Some subsequent English editions restore the notes, appendices, and bibliography omitted from the first English edition.

Karl Marx: His Life and Environment (1939)

Karl Marx: His Life and Environment is a 1939 biography of Karl Marx by Isaiah Berlin, in which Berlin argues that Marx's system of thought depends upon indefensible metaphysical presuppositions.

Karl Marx: His Life and Thought (1973)

Karl Marx: His Life and Thought is a 1973 biography of Karl Marx by political scientist David McLellan. The work was republished as Karl Marx: A Biography in 1995.

Marx without Myth (1975)
Marx Without Myth: A Chronological Study of his Life and Work by Maximilien Rubel

21st century

Karl Marx (2010)

Karl Marx is a 2010 biography by journalist Francis Wheen.

Karl Marx: A Nineteenth Century Life (2013)
Karl Marx: A Nineteenth Century Life is a 2013 biography of Karl Marx by Jonathan Sperber.

Karl Marx: Greatness and Illusion (2016)
Karl Marx: Greatness and Illusion is a 2016 biography of Karl Marx by British historian Gareth Stedman-Jones.

Karl Marx and the Birth of Modern Society (2019)
Karl Marx and the Birth of Modern Society: The Life of Marx and the Development of His Work. Volume I: 1818-1841 is a 2019 (German edition 2018) biography by German political scientist Michael Heinrich.

Minor works

Karl Marx (1892)

Friedrich Engels

20th century

Marx: The Man and His Message (1910)
Marx: The Man and His Message is a biography by Keir Hardie.

Karl Marx. A Brief Biographical Sketch With an Exposition of Marxism (1914)
Karl Marx. A Brief Biographical Sketch With an Exposition of Marxism. Written: 
1914
Vladimir Lenin

Karl Marx (1938)
1938: Karl Marx, London: Chapman & Hall / New York: John Wiley & Sons.[3] Originally published as part of a series "Modern Sociologists". Reissued 1963. Published in original German version 1967. Translated in Italian, French, Spanish and Greek. Many times reissued.
Karl Korsch

Karl Marx (1968)
Written by Heinrich Gemkow.

Marx, Life and Works (1980)
Marx, Life and Works (New York: Macmillan, 1980)
Maximilien Rubel

Otto Ruhle

Karl Marx: An intellectual biography
Karl Marx: An intellectual biography is a biography of Karl Marx by Rolf Hosfeld.

Marx I
Marx I is a biography by Michel Henry. Followed by Marx II.

Karl Marx: Anthropologist
Karl Marx: Anthropologist is a book by American professor and chair of anthropology Thomas C. Patterson.

21st century

Karl Marx: An Illustrated Biography (2000)

Karl Marx: Critical Lives
Two Centuries of Karl Marx Biographies: An Overview by Angelo Segrillo

See also
Karl Marx
Karl Marx in film
Two Centuries of Karl Marx Biographies: An Overview by Angelo Segrillo

References

 
Depictions of people in literature
Lists of books